Beaufort is the name of a noble family of 14th and 15th-century England, descended from John of Gaunt, 1st Duke of Lancaster.  For a list of individual Beauforts, see House of Beaufort.

 Carel Godin de Beaufort (1934–1964), Dutch Porsche Formula 1 Driver 1957 - 1964
 Jacques-Antoine Beaufort  (1721–1784), French painter
 Lieven Ferdinand de Beaufort  (1879–1968), Dutch biologist

Beaufort or de Beaufort is also the surname of members of a particular Huguenot family 
 Count Francis de Beaufort (1661–1714), Court Chancellor to the Prince of Lippe-Detmond
 Daniel Cornelius de Beaufort (1700–1788), Church of England, and later, Church of Ireland Clergyman
 Daniel Augustus Beaufort (1739–1821), Church of Ireland Clergyman, author and map maker
 Sir Francis Beaufort (1774–1857), Irish hydrographer and naval officer, creator of the Beaufort scale, namesake of the Beaufort Sea
 Louisa Beaufort (1781–1863), Irish antiquarian, author and artist

See also
 Duke of Beaufort (England), a dukedom in the Peerage of England
 Duke of Beaufort (France), a title in French nobility

French-language surnames